Social dances are dances that have a social functions and context. Social dances are intended for participation rather than performance. They are often danced merely to socialise and for entertainment, though they may have ceremonial, competitive and erotic functions.

Many social dances of European origin are in recent centuries partner dances (see Ballroom dance) but this is quite rare elsewhere, where there may instead be circle dances or line dances, perhaps reserved for those of a certain age, gender or social position.

Social dance in the west

The types of dance performed in social gatherings change with social values. Social dance music of the 14th century has been preserved in manuscript, though without proper choreography, for dances such as the ballo, carol, stampita, saltarello, trotto and roto(dance). The 15th century is the first period from which written records of dances exist. A manuscript from Brussels highlights the Burgundian court dance, which spread all over Europe, referred to as the basse dance in which a large group perform a series of steps in triple time. Italian courts danced balli, with a wide array of choreographed rhythms, steps and positions for the dancers. These were documented in instruction books written by the dance masters who choreographed them for the courts.

Social dances of lower classes were not recorded until the Late Renaissance. According to Richard Powers, courtiers in the late 16th century continually had to "prove themselves through their social skills, especially through dance." Recorded social dances of the late 16th century include the pavane and the Canary dance. Thoinot Arbeau's book Orchésographie describes peasant branles as well as the 16th century basse danse and la volta''. The peasants from the countryside supplied new dances to the court as the old ones' novelty wore out.

During the Baroque Era court balls served to display social status. A formal ball opened with a branle in which couples stood in a line in order of their place in the social hierarchy, the most highly regarded couples dancing first. The Menuet and the Gavotte gained popularity. Balls often ended with an English country dance. France gained a pre-eminence in dance, but the French Revolution created a shift away from formality.

During the Regency Era, from 1811 to 1830, the Quadrille became the most popular dance in England and France. The Quadrille consisted of a large variety of steps that skimmed the ground, such as chassé and jeté. Most other dances of this era, such as the Mazurka, were performed in lines and squares.

The waltz, which arrived in Britain toward the end of the Napoleonic Wars, was a partner dance in which partners danced more closely than had previously been considered acceptable. In the waltz, neither partner led. Individuals danced as equals, which was new at the time. The Polka was another dance that arose during this time in which partners were scandalously close. According to Powers, the dances of this time were "fresh, inventive, youthful, and somewhat daring," which mirrored society at the time.

20th century America

Towards the end of the 19th century, Americans were tiring of the court dances of their grandparents' era. In the early 20th century, Americans began pairing Victorian dances such as the Two-Step with Ragtime music. Other dances included the African American Cakewalk, and animal dances such as the Turkey Trot. The most popular social dance of the time was the One-Step. The dance consisted of couples taking one step on each beat of the music, so even beginners could participate.

The introduction of the phonograph record marked a shift toward dancing to recorded music, as radio stations, jukeboxes, and sock hops played records to dance to.

Swing dance in the 1930s has grown in popularity, taking many dance forms, some of them, such as Lindy Hop or West Coast Swing have survived to today.

Rock 'n' roll in the 1950s brought about a shift in social dancing toward rebelliousness. This shift was seen especially in teenagers who did not want to dance the same steps that their parents did. The dancing was mostly swing based but had a variations in different regions. Couples began dancing as individuals for the first time, sending the message that there did not have to be a leader and a follower.

Social Dancing in Europe
Social dance in Europe has its long traditions that go into the 17th Century and earlier. Many European countries have developed their own national social dancing traditions that remain active.

References

Further reading

 
Articles containing video clips